8-OH-PBZI is a drug used in scientific research which acts as a potent and selective agonist for the dopamine D3 receptor.

References 

Dopamine agonists
Pyrrolidines
Phenols